Samsung Omnia Pro may refer to:

Mobile phones
Samsung Omnia Pro B7320
Samsung Omnia Pro B7330
Samsung Omnia Pro B7610